Big Creek is a stream in southern Madison and northeastern Wayne counties the U.S. state of Missouri. It is a tributary of the Castor River.

The stream flows southeast parallel to Missouri Route M into Wayne County.

Big Creek was named so because it is large relative to other nearby creeks.

See also
List of rivers of Missouri

References

Rivers of Madison County, Missouri
Rivers of Wayne County, Missouri
Rivers of Missouri